Claudio Agnisetta (born 29 December 1943) is an Italian sprint canoer who competed in the mid-1960s. He finished sixth in the K-4 1000 m event at the 1964 Summer Olympics in Tokyo. He was born in Rome.

References
Sports-reference.com profile

External links

1943 births
Canoeists at the 1964 Summer Olympics
Italian male canoeists
Living people
Olympic canoeists of Italy
20th-century Italian people